María Díaz (Madrid, June 11, 1997), better known as María de Nati, is a Spanish actress known for her multiple appearances in television series, especially in El secreto de Puente Viejo (2015-2016), La víctima número 8 (2018) or Madres.Amor y vida (2020-2021). She has also participated in the films Que Dios nos perdone (2016) and El reino (2018) by Rodrigo Sorogoyen and in the comedies Si yo fuera rico (2019) by Álvaro Fernández Armero and El buen patrón (2021) by Fernando León de Aranoa.

Biography 
Born in Madrid in 1997, she played her first role in 2014 in the Telecinco series El Rey. Only a year later she signed with Antena 3 to participate in El secreto de Puente Viejo in the role of Prado Castañeda.

In 2016 she played the character of Elena in the film Que Dios nos perdone, by Rodrigo Sorogoyen. A year later, she participated in the series Monica Chef, Reinas, Apaches and Disney Cracks.

In 2018 she participated in Rodrigo Sorogoyen's new film, El reino, and had a leading role in the ETB2 La víctima número 8, where she played Edurne. In addition, she participated in other fictions such as La verdad for Telecinco or the first season of Bajo la red for Playz. She also starred in the series Todo por el juego for the Movistar+ platform.

In 2019 she participated in the second season of Bajo la red and recorded the web-series Terror.app for Flooxer, Atresmedia's digital platform. In addition, she also had a small role in the film Si yo fuera rico. In 2020 she participated in one of the episodes of the second season of Gente hablando for Flooxer and got one of the supporting roles in Madres.Amor y vida for Telecinco and Amazon Prime Video,  playing Juani Soler. She remained in the supporting cast for the first two seasons of the series and moved up to the main cast in the third season.

In 2021 she signed for Deudas for Atresplayer Premium, playing Sara. In addition, it was announced her signing for Aitor Gabilondo's new series for Telecinco, Entrevías, which has José Coronado and Luis Zahera in its cast. In 2021 she also premiered the feature film El buen patrón, starring Javier Bardem and directed by Fernando León de Aranoa, which had its preview at the San Sebastián International Film Festival.

Filmography

Television

Cinema

References

External links 
 

Spanish television actresses
Spanish film actresses
Living people
1997 births